Celina de Sola (born November 5, 1976 in El Salvador) is a Salvadoran humanitarian worker and public health expert.  She is the Co-founder and Vice President of programs at Glasswing International, a non-profit international organization headquartered in San Salvador and New York City.

Education 
De Sola received a Bachelor of Arts degree and a Master of Social Work (M.S.W.)  from the University of Pennsylvania. She also received a Master of Public Health (M.P.H.) from Harvard University.

Career 
Early in her career, de Sola worked as a consultant for organizations including the Population Council, URC, and Family Foundation Schools. She was also a crisis interventionist for Latino immigrants in the United States. As Director of emergency response for AmeriCares, de Sola led responses to humanitarian crises including Liberia, Darfur, Afghanistan, Iraq, as well as the tsunami in Indonesia.

Glasswing International
After a long career in humanitarian responses and implementation of international public health programs, de Sola decided to return to El Salvador.  She had interest in applying her international experience to transform vulnerable communities. Then in 2007, together with her brother Diego and husband Ken Baker, she co-founded Glasswing International, a non-profit organization in Latin America, the Caribbean and NYC. Its mission is to address the root causes of poverty and violence through public education, public health and community empowerment in San Salvador, El Salvador. As the organization's Vice President of  programs, de Solas designs and implements community-based initiatives that bring institutions and people together through joint action.

Recognition 
In 2018, de Sola was selected to join the inaugural Obama Foundation Fellowship class.  De Sola has been recognized by several notable organizations including The Tällberg Foundation ("Tällberg Global Leader", 2016), the Ashoka (Fellowship since 2015), LEGO Foundation, and Skoll Foundation. 

De Sola has also presented at violence prevention conferences organized by the World Health Organization, USAID, Violence Prevention Coalition of Greater Los Angeles, and the Women in the World Summit. Her work has been featured on several notable media including CNN and HuffPost Live.

Personal life 
De Sola is married to Ken Baker, a co-founder of Glasswing International and has a young son. They live in San Salvador and New York City.

References

External links
  Celina de Sola's page

1976 births
Living people
Social workers
Humanitarians
Harvard University alumni
University of Pennsylvania alumni